This article contains a list of National Cultural Sites in Uganda in the Eastern Region of Uganda as defined by the Uganda Museum.

List of monuments 

|}

See also 
 National Cultural Sites in Uganda for other National Cultural Sites in Uganda

References

Eastern
Cultural Heritage Monuments, Eastern
Eastern Region, Uganda